The 2009 Royal Trophy was the third edition of the Royal Trophy, a team golf event contested between teams representing Asia and Europe. It was held from 9–11 January at the Amata Spring Country Club in Thailand. The Asian team won for the first time, by a margin of 10 points to 6.

Teams

Schedule
9 January (Friday)  Foursomes x 4
10 January (Saturday)  Four-ball x 4
11 January (Sunday)  Singles x 8

Friday's matches (foursomes)

Saturday's matches (four-ball)

Sunday's matches (singles)

References

External links
Official site
Results and reports from Golf Today

Royal Trophy
Golf tournaments in Thailand
Royal Trophy
Royal Trophy
Royal Trophy